C. Vanniasingam was the 30th Surveyor General of Sri Lanka. He was appointed in 1970, succeeding C. T. Goonawardana, and held the office until 1971. He was succeeded by R. A. Gunawardana.

References

Surveyor General of Sri Lanka